Tiny Toon Adventures is an American animated television series created by Warner Bros. Animation and Amblin Entertainment. It aired for three seasons between 1990 and 1992, accounting for a total of 98 episodes. Most episodes are either divided into three seven-minute segments with wraparounds before each segment, or a single segment of approximately 22 minutes; eight episodes use a "two shorts" format. Besides the 98 episodes, two specials aired: "Tiny Toons Spring Break" and "Tiny Toons' Night Ghoulery". A direct-to-video release, the 79 minute Tiny Toon Adventures: How I Spent My Vacation also aired in four parts as part of the show's episode package.

Series overview

Episodes 
The episodes' production codes indicate which studio animated the show:
 KC = Kennedy Cartoons
 A = AKOM
 TMS = Tokyo Movie Shinsha
 W = Wang Film Productions
 FC = Freelance Animators New Zealand
 E = Encore Cartoons
 ST = StarToons

Season 1 (1990–1991)

Season 2 (1991–1992)

Tiny Toon Adventures: How I Spent My Vacation (1992)

Season 3 (1992)

Specials (1994–1995)

References 

1990s television-related lists
Tiny Toon Adventures
Tiny Toon Adventures